Kineke Alicia Alexander (born 21 February 1986 in Kingstown, Saint Vincent and the Grenadines) is a Vincentian sprinter who competed in the 400m event at the 2008 Summer Olympics and the 2012 Summer Olympics. She was the flag bearer for Saint Vincent and the Grenadines at the 2008 opening ceremony and the 2012 opening ceremony.  She was also the Saint Vincent and the Grenadines flagbearer at the 2014 Commonwealth Games.

At the 2008 Summer Olympics, she finished in 4th place in her 400 m heat and therefore did not progress further.  At the London 2012 Olympics, Kineke competed in the first Round of the Women's 400m but she didn't finish. Alexander qualified for the 2016 Summer Olympics and was again the flag bearer for the Saint Vincent and the Grenadines. At the 2016 Summer Olympics, she finished 7th in her heat and did not qualify for the semifinals.

Personal bests

Achievements

1: Did not show in the semifinal.

References 

1986 births
Living people
People from Kingstown
Olympic athletes of Saint Vincent and the Grenadines
Saint Vincent and the Grenadines female sprinters
Athletes (track and field) at the 2008 Summer Olympics
Athletes (track and field) at the 2012 Summer Olympics
Athletes (track and field) at the 2016 Summer Olympics
Athletes (track and field) at the 2006 Commonwealth Games
Athletes (track and field) at the 2014 Commonwealth Games
Athletes (track and field) at the 2018 Commonwealth Games
Commonwealth Games competitors for Saint Vincent and the Grenadines
Athletes (track and field) at the 2007 Pan American Games
Athletes (track and field) at the 2011 Pan American Games
Athletes (track and field) at the 2015 Pan American Games
Pan American Games bronze medalists for Saint Vincent and the Grenadines
Pan American Games medalists in athletics (track and field)
World Athletics Championships athletes for Saint Vincent and the Grenadines
Medalists at the 2015 Pan American Games
Central American and Caribbean Games medalists in athletics
Olympic female sprinters